Calm Head is the most south westerly point of the Falkland Islands, and is on West Falkland. It is to the south west of Port Stephens, and shelters it.

Bird Island is nearby.

References

Headlands of West Falkland